Charge and Bail is a Nigerian comedy-drama film directed by Uyoyou Adia and co-produced by Eku Edewor and Matilda Ogunleye. The film stars Zainab Balogun with Stan Nze, Femi Adebayo, Folu Storms, Tope Olowoniyan, and Eso Dike in supporting roles. The film tells the story of Boma, a high-flying graduate of law from the upper class who finds herself posted to a charge and bail law firm during her NYSC year.

The film was scheduled to premiere on 21 October 2021.

Cast
 Zainab Balogun as Boma
 Stan Nze as Dotun
 Femi Adebayo as Wole  
 Folu Storms
 Tope Olowoniyan
 Eso Dike
 Craze Clown
 Chigul
 Bimbo Manuel
 Chris Iheuwa
 Pere Egbi

References

External links 
 

English-language Nigerian films
2021 films
2021 comedy-drama films
2020s English-language films